Poko is a territory  and a locality of Bas-Uele province in the Democratic Republic of the Congo.

Composition  
It is composed of 13 collectivities (Chiefdoms and sectors):

References 

Territories of Bas-Uélé Province